BNS Surma is a  offshore patrol vessel of the Bangladesh Navy. She is serving the Bangladesh Navy from 2013.

Career
The ship was ordered on 2 May 2010. Her launching was done at 23 January 2013. She was handed over to the Bangladesh Navy on 6 May 2013. On 29 August 2013, she was commissioned to the Bangladesh Navy. She is currently serving under the command of Commodore Commanding BN Khulna (COMKHUL).

Design
The vessel has a displacement of 350 tonnes. Her complement is 45 persons and can carry out missions lasting up to seven days at a time.

Armament
The ship is equipped with a pair of 20 mm anti-aircraft guns and a pair of 37 mm guns. The vessel can also be equipped with naval mines and MANPADS.

See also
BNS Padma
BNS Aparajeya 
BNS Adamya 
BNS Atandra 
 List of active ships of the Bangladesh Navy

References

Ships of the Bangladesh Navy
Patrol vessels of the Bangladesh Navy
Padma-class Patrol Vessel
2013 ships
Ships built at Khulna Shipyard